The Indiana Oaks is a Grade III American Thoroughbred horse race for three-year-old fillies run over a distance of  miles on the dirt held annually in July at Horseshoe Indianapolis in Shelbyville, Indiana.

History

The Indiana Oaks was inaugurated on 16 September 1995 at Hoosier Park and run over a distance of 1 mile. The event was won by the short odds-on Niner's Home who withstood the fast closing Alltheway Bertie to win by a neck in a time 1:37 flat on a fast track.

The event was held over a mile in 1996 before being extended to the current distance of  miles in 1997.
 
The event was upgraded to Grade III in 2001 and in 2008 to Grade II. It held this classification until 2017 when the event was downgraded back to Grade III.

The event carried Breeders' Cup incentives between 1998 and 2006 which were reflected in the name of the event.

In 2013 the event was moved to Indiana Grand, now known as Horseshoe Indianapolis. Since 2015, the race has been held in July.

Records 
 
Speed record:
  miles: 1:41.85 - Grace Hall (2012)
 1 mile: 1:37.00 - Princess Eloise (1996) & Niner's Home (1995) 

Margins: 
 8 lengths – Bare Necessities  (2002)

Most wins by a jockey:
 4 - Julien Leparoux (2011, 2016, 2017, 2018)

Most wins by a trainer:
 2 - Carl Nafzger (1995, 2014)
 2 - Brad H. Cox (2020, 2022)

Most wins by an owner:

 2 - WinStar Farm: (2003, 2017)
 2 - Flurry Racing Stables (2020, 2022)

Winners

See also 
 List of American and Canadian Graded races
 Indiana Oaks top three finishes and starters

References

Horse races in Indiana
Graded stakes races in the United States
Flat horse races for three-year-old fillies
Recurring sporting events established in 1995
1995 establishments in Indiana
Grade 3 stakes races in the United States